Statistics of the Primera División de México for the 1946–47 season.

Overview
It was contested by 15 teams, and Atlante won the championship.

Teams

League standings

Results

References
Mexico - List of final tables (RSSSF)
- Mexico 1946/47 (RSSSF)

1946-47
Mex
1946–47 in Mexican football